Chaetostephana inclusa is a moth of the family Noctuidae. It is found in Angola, the Democratic Republic of Congo, Guinea and Malawi.

References

Moths described in 1895
Agaristinae
Lepidoptera of Angola
Lepidoptera of the Democratic Republic of the Congo
Lepidoptera of West Africa
Lepidoptera of Malawi
Moths of Sub-Saharan Africa